Radomira "Radka" Zrubáková (born 26 December 1970) is a retired tennis player from Slovakia.

Zrubáková gained professional status in 1986. In her career, she won three singles and two doubles titles on the WTA Tour. She was a member of the Czechoslovakia Federation Cup team that won the 1988 Federation Cup final. Zrubáková reached career-high rankings of 22 in singles (in October 1991) and 38 in doubles (in April 1993).  She retired from the pro tour in 1999.

WTA career finals

Singles: 4 (3–1)

Doubles: 6 (2–4)

ITF Circuit finals

Singles (3–2)

Doubles (5–8)

External links
 
 
 
 
 
 

1970 births
Living people
Czechoslovak female tennis players
Olympic tennis players of Czechoslovakia
Olympic tennis players of Slovakia
Tennis players from Bratislava
Slovak female tennis players
Tennis players at the 1992 Summer Olympics
Tennis players at the 1996 Summer Olympics
US Open (tennis) junior champions
Grand Slam (tennis) champions in girls' doubles